Árvore is a civil parish in the municipality of Vila do Conde, Portugal. The population in 2021 is 5,562, according to the census. The civil parish has an area of 6.56 km².

References

Freguesias of Vila do Conde